Alec Edward Asher (born October 4, 1991) is an American former professional baseball pitcher. He played in Major League Baseball (MLB) for the Philadelphia Phillies, Baltimore Orioles, and Milwaukee Brewers and the Uni-President Lions of the Chinese Professional Baseball League (CPBL).

Career
Asher had Tommy John surgery when he was 14 years old. He attended McKeel Academy of Technology through his sophomore year of high school. He then transferred to Charlotte High School during his Junior year, but later went on to graduate from Lakeland Senior High School.

Asher was drafted by the San Francisco Giants in the 23rd round of the 2010 Major League Baseball draft out of Lakeland Senior High School in Lakeland, Florida. He had agreed to an $80,000 signing bonus with the Giants, however the team decided not to sign Asher after a bone spur was revealed in his physical. He attended Santa Fe College for a year before transferring to Polk Community College.

Texas Rangers
He was drafted by the Texas Rangers in the fourth round of the 2012 Major League Baseball (MLB) draft. He made his professional debut for the Spokane Indians that year. He pitched in 20 games as a relief pitcher, finishing with a 3.09 earned run average (ERA), five saves and 50 strikeouts over 35 innings.

In 2013, Asher was a starting pitcher for the Myrtle Beach Pelicans. He appeared in 26 games with 25 starts and went 9–7 with a 2.90 ERA and 139 strikeouts over  innings.

Philadelphia Phillies
On July 31, 2015, Asher was traded to the Philadelphia Phillies along with Nick Williams, Jorge Alfaro, Jake Thompson, Matt Harrison, and Jerad Eickhoff in exchange for Cole Hamels and Jake Diekman. He made his major league debut on August 30.

On June 16, 2016, Asher was suspended for 80 games for violating MLB's drug policy after testing positive for chlorodehydromethyltestosterone.

Baltimore Orioles
Asher was traded to the Baltimore Orioles for a player to be named later on March 28, 2017. Asher made his season debut on April 15 against the Toronto Blue Jays. In the start, he tossed 6 innings, giving up just one run while striking out five. He earned a no decision in a 2-1 Orioles' loss. He earned his first win of the year on April 26 against the Tampa Bay Rays. Out of the bullpen, Asher gave up a run in the eleventh inning, before the Orioles would score two in the bottom half to win 5–4.

Asher was designated for assignment on March 29, 2018.

Los Angeles Dodgers
Asher was claimed off waivers by the Los Angeles Dodgers on April 5, 2018.

Milwaukee Brewers
On April 17, 2018, he was claimed off waivers by the Milwaukee Brewers. The Brewers designated him for assignment two days later. He elected free agency on October 23, 2018.

Colorado Rockies
On January 26, 2019, Asher signed a minor league deal with the Colorado Rockies. He was released on March 14, 2019.

Sugar Land Skeeters
On April 15, 2019, Asher signed with the Sugar Land Skeeters of the Atlantic League of Professional Baseball. He was released on May 2, 2019.

Long Island Ducks
On May 13, 2019, Asher signed with the Long Island Ducks of the Atlantic League of Professional Baseball.

Uni-President Lions
On June 19, 2019, Asher's contract was purchased by the Uni-President Lions of the Chinese Professional Baseball League.

Minnesota Twins
On January 28, 2020, Asher signed a minor league deal with the Minnesota Twins. Asher did not play in a game in 2020 due to the cancellation of the minor league season because of the COVID-19 pandemic. He became a free agent on November 2, 2020.

See also
List of Major League Baseball players suspended for performance-enhancing drugs

References

External links

Polk State Eagles bio

1991 births
Living people
Sportspeople from Lakeland, Florida
American sportspeople in doping cases
Baseball players from Florida
Lakeland High School (Lakeland, Florida) alumni
Major League Baseball players suspended for drug offenses
Polk State College alumni
Major League Baseball pitchers
Philadelphia Phillies players
Baltimore Orioles players
Milwaukee Brewers players
Spokane Indians players
Myrtle Beach Pelicans players
Frisco RoughRiders players
Round Rock Express players
Lehigh Valley IronPigs players
Reading Fightin Phils players
Florida Complex League Phillies players
Gigantes del Cibao players
American expatriate baseball players in the Dominican Republic
Norfolk Tides players
Oklahoma City Dodgers players
Colorado Springs Sky Sox players
Sugar Land Skeeters players
Long Island Ducks players
American expatriate baseball players in Taiwan
Uni-President Lions players
Junior college baseball players in the United States